Heterocarpus is a genus of deep-sea shrimp, mainly of tropical areas all over the world.

Description
Heterocarpus is characterised by the highly unequal second pair of pereiopods: one side is long and thin and the other is short but stronger, besides the carapace with one or more longitudinal carinae.

Species
So far, 30 species have been described for this genus, Heterocarpus ensifer being the type species. The described species of this genus are:

Heterocarpus abulbus Yang, Chan & Chu, 2010
Heterocarpus affins Faxon, 1893
Heterocarpus alexandri A. Milne-Edwards, 1883
Heterocarpus amacula Crosnier, 1988
Heterocarpus calmani Crosnier, 1988
Heterocarpus chani Li, 2006
Heterocarpus corona Yang, Chan & Chu, 2010
Heterocarpus cutressi Monterossa, 1988
Heterocarpus dorsalis Bate, 1888
Heterocarpus ensifer A. Milne-Edwards, 1881
Heterocarpus inopinatus Tavares, 1999
Heterocarpus intermedius Crosnier, 1999
Heterocarpus gibbosus Bate, 1888
Heterocarpus grimaldii A. Milne-Edwards & Bouvier, 1900
Heterocarpus hayashii Crosnier, 1988
Heterocarpus hostilis Faxon, 1893
Heterocarpus laevigatus Bate, 1888
Heterocarpus lepidus De Man, 1917
Heterocarpus longirostris McGilchrist, 1905
Heterocarpus neisi Burukovsky, 1986
Heterocarpus oryx A. Milne-Edwards, 1881
Heterocarpus parvispina Crosnier, 1988
Heterocarpus reedi Bahamondi, 1955
Heterocarpus sibogae De Man, 1917
Heterocarpus signatus Rathbun, 1906
Heterocarpus tenuidentatus Crosnier, 2006
Heterocarpus tricarinatus Alcock & Anderson, 1894
Heterocarpus unicarinatus Borradeile, 1915
Heterocarpus woodmasoni Alcock, 1901
Heterocarpus vicarius Faxon, 1893

Ecology

Many Heterocarpus shrimp are known for using bioluminescence as a defense, spitting it on predators. Studies about their feeding habits, and the fact that they may be found in the stomach contents of some pelagic sharks and other fishes is interpreted as they have benthic habits, but they do migrations to the water column at night. Some species of this genus have high fishery potential, such as H. reedi  and H. laevigatus.

References

Caridea